The St. Louis Globe-Democrat was originally a daily print newspaper based in St. Louis, Missouri, from 1852 until 1986. When the trademark registration on the name expired, it was then used as an unrelated free historically themed paper.

Original publication (1852–1986)
It began operations on July 1, 1852, as The Daily Missouri Democrat, changing its name to The Missouri Democrat in 1868,
then to The St. Louis Democrat in 1873. It merged with the St. Louis Globe (founded in 1872) to form the St. Louis Globe-Democrat in 1875.

The newspaper was the morning paper for Greater St. Louis and had some competition from the St. Louis Post-Dispatch (created by a merger of the St. Louis Post and the St. Louis Dispatch) and the St. Louis Star-Times (created by a merger of The St. Louis Star and The St. Louis Times). The Star-Times ceased operations in 1951. Both the Globe-Democrat and the rival Post-Dispatch carried on for three more decades, eventually under a joint operating agreement, until the Globe-Democrat, after changing ownership and leaving the agreement, finally ceased operations in October 1986.

The Globe-Democrat was considered the more conservative leaning paper of the two major dailies, with the Post-Dispatch considered more left leaning.

Casper Yost became editor of the paper in 1889. He later was a founder of the American Society of Newspaper Editors.

Frederick H. Britton was on the editorial staff of the Globe-Democrat in 1923.
Political commentator, syndicated columnist, author, politician, speechwriter, and broadcaster Pat Buchanan launched his career at the Globe-Democrat in 1961 (at the age of 23) as an editor.

History

In their earliest days, the predecessor newspapers which eventually merged to form the St. Louis Globe-Democrat were staunch advocates of freedom and anti-slavery in Missouri. The Globe-Democrat eventually became the most widely read morning paper in St. Louis, with a huge circulation, and used this base of support to promote civic responsibility and great causes regarding urban improvements. A casualty in the 1980s of an antitrust collusion agreement between the heirs of SI Newhouse (Conde Nast, owner) and the St. Louis Post Dispatch to close the Globe and enter into a 50-year profit-sharing arrangement put the Globe-Democrat out of business.

In 1968, the Globe-Democrat went to the U.S. Supreme Court to defend itself against claims that setting maximum prices for newspaper deliveries violated antitrust law. In Albrecht v. Herald Co., the majority found the paper guilty of vertical price fixing.

The Globe-Democrat had operated since 1959 under the protection of the Newspaper Preservation Act, under which papers must show proof of irreversible financial losses before closing. The Post-Dispatch, owned by the Pulitzer Publishing Company, handled all printing and publication for both papers. Advertising was sold jointly, and profits were shared equally.

In St. Louis, the morning advantage was reduced by the terms of the joint operating agreement entered into by the two papers in 1959 and expanded in 1969 and 1979. The papers shared all business and advertising functions, with only the news functions separate.
Until the last fiscal year, the Post-Globe agency, as the joint operation was known, operated in the red. The agency was said to be making a marginal profit that year.

In August 1986 the paper filed for Chapter 11 bankruptcy protection. At the time the newspaper listed $8 million in debts. In December the newspaper suspended publication.

In January 1986 Veritas Corporation purchased the paper for $500,000. Veritas, formed by businessmen John B. Prentis and William E. Franke committed to contribute $4 million to the newspaper's operations. The Globe-Democrat ended publication in October after the newspaper failed to secure a necessary $15 million loan from the state of Missouri. An attorney had challenged the legality of the state's ability to grant that particular bond package, passed in the state legislature earlier that year.

The Globe-Democrat Building at 710 N Tucker Blvd, now known simply as the Globe Building in downtown St. Louis is still used for offices and data centers by various businesses and organizations on a rental basis. This building was built in 1931 and designed by St. Louis firm Mauran, Russell & Crowell. Some elements of the building were preserved by the National Building Arts Center.

The Globe-Democrat'''s  morgue of articles and photographs is housed in the St. Louis Mercantile Library at the University of Missouri–St. Louis (UMSL).

Since 1993 the St. Louis Globe-Democrat has been published as a history and nostalgia paper. This publication was founded as the St. Louis Inquirer in 1986 and later acquired the Globe-Democrat name.

Notable people
Eunice Gibbs Allyn
Alice B. Tweedy
Rose Marion Boylan (ca. 1875-1947), feature writer
Rosa Kershaw Walker (ca. 1870s-1880s), society section writer

See alsoSt. Louis BeaconSt. Louis Sun''

External links 

 St. Louis Globe-Democrat Collection finding aid at the St. Louis Public Library

References

1852 establishments in Missouri
1986 disestablishments in the United States
Defunct newspapers published in Missouri
Globe-Democrat
Globe-Democrat
Publications disestablished in 1986